The Greatest Hits Is the first compilation album of English crossover classical group Il Divo, released on 26 November 2012 in Europe and 8 December 2012 in the United States.

The album was issued to celebrate Il Divo's eighth anniversary as a group. The album includes four new recordings; the classical "Il Mio Cuore Va – My Heart Will Go On", "Solo – Alone", "Siempre te amaré – I Will Always Love You", and "Can't Help Falling in Love", together with other songs chosen by fans.

Track listing

Disc 1 
 "Il mio cuore va – My Heart Will Go On"
 "I Will Always Love You (Siempre Te Amaré)"
 "Can't Help Falling in Love"
 "Alone (Solo)"
 "Senza Catene – Unchained Melody"
 "Amazing Grace"
 "Heroe"
 "Regresa a mí – Unbreak My Heart"
 "Somewhere"
 "Passerà"
 "All by Myself (Solo Otra Vez)"
 "Mama"
 "Adagio"
 "Without You (Desde el Dia Que Te Fuiste)"
 "Caruso"
 "Don't Cry for Me Argentina"
 "My Way (A Mi Manera)"
 "Time to Say Goodbye – Con te partirò"

Disc 2 
 "Nights in White Satin (Notte di Luce)"
 "Nella Fantasia"
 "Ave Maria"
 "La Vida Sin Amor"
 "Everytime I Look at You"
 "The Power of Love (La Fuerza Mayor)"
 "You Raise Me Up (Por ti seré)"
 "Crying (Llorando)"
 "She"
 "Hallelujah (Aleluya)"
 "Don't Let the Sun Go Down on Me (Pour que tu m'aimes encore)"
 "The Impossible Dream (The Quest)"
 "O Holy Night"

Deluxe limited edition 
A deluxe limited edition of the album was released, limited to 3,000 copies. All were signed personally and contain:
 Albums: Il Divo; Ancora; Always; The Promise; Wicked Game; The Christmas Collection and The Greatest Hits 
 DVDs: Encore; Live at the Greek Theater; At the Coliseum; An Evening with Il Divo: Live in Barcelona; Live in London
 Five books by Il Divo
 Binocular lenses, in a velvet embroidery

Personnel

Il Divo 
 Carlos Marín 
 Sébastien Izambard 
 David Miller 
 Urs Bühler

Charts

Weekly charts

Year-end charts

Certifications

References 

Il Divo albums
2012 compilation albums